Alexis Miart (born 20 February 1992) is a French former ice dancer. With former partner Tiffany Zahorski, he placed 4th at the 2011 World Junior Championships.

Personal life 
Miart was born in L'isle-Adam, Paris, France. He has two older brothers. He currently lives and trains in Lyon.

Career

Early career 
Miart started skating at the age of 8. He came to figure skating by mistake, when he thought he'd been invited to attend an ice hockey lesson. Miart began in single skating, training alongside Florent Amodio, at the Cergy rink, just outside Paris. He became known as the 'Showman from Cergy' and was advised that his skills were better suited to ice dancing. Consequently, in September 2008, Miart relocated to Lyon to commence dance training with Muriel Zazoui and Romain Haguenauer.

Partnership with Zahorski
Miart teamed up with Tiffany Zahorski in March 2009. They placed 4th at the 2011 World Junior Championships, with a second-place finish in the free dance. They elected to compete in the senior ranks the following season. In early July 2011, Miart sustained a fracture to the right malleolus. Zahorski trained alone for two and a half months while he recuperated. They consequently missed the 2011 fall season, but returned to competition in time for the 2012 French Nationals. After winning the bronze medal there, they were named to the French team to the 2012 European Championships. In the preliminary round at Europeans, an aborted lift and both skaters falling on another lift cost them almost twenty points and qualification to the short dance.

Zahorski and Miart received an assignment to the 2012 Trophée Eric Bompard but withdrew. On 9 November 2012, it was confirmed that their partnership had ended.

Programs 
(with Zahorski)

Competitive highlights 
(with Zahorski)

References

External links 

 
 2011 Junior World Championships Results
 2010 Junior Grand Prix Final Results
 2010 NRW Trophy Results
 2010 Ostrava, Czech Republic JGP Results
 2010 Brasov, Roumania JGP Results
 2009-2010 Spanish Figure Skating Championship Results

French male ice dancers
1992 births
Living people
Figure skaters from Paris